Copromorpha lichenitis is a moth in the Copromorphidae family. It is found in Australia, where it has been recorded from Queensland.

The wingspan is about 28 mm. The forewings are greenish, the costa and central part of disc suffused with whitish. The hindwings are pale-fuscous.

References

Natural History Museum Lepidoptera generic names catalog

Copromorphidae
Moths described in 1916